Blue hall could be

 Blue Hall - the main hall of the Stockholm City Hall
 Legislative Assembly of Quebec - the name of the lower house of Quebec's legislature until December 31, 1968.